The  Washington Redskins season was the franchise's 51st season in the National Football League (NFL) and their 46th in Washington, D.C. Although the Redskins lost all their preseason games, they were to advance from an 8–8 record the previous season to become one of the only 2 teams in NFL history to win the Super Bowl after not winning a pre-season game (the other being the 2021 Los Angeles Rams). Only the 1990 Buffalo Bills and the 2000 New York Giants have since made it to the Super Bowl after a winless pre-season.

The 1982 NFL season was shortened from sixteen games per team to nine because of a players’ strike. The NFL adopted a special 16-team playoff tournament; division standings were ignored, and the top eight teams from each conference earned playoff berths with seeds corresponding to their position in the conference standings. With the best record in the NFC, Washington received the number one seed in the conference for the playoff tournament. Although they and the Los Angeles Raiders had identical 8–1 records, the Redskins were the best in the league because they had a +62-point differential, which was 2 more than the Raiders.

The Redskins marched through the NFC playoffs, beating each of their opponents by an average of 19 points. In a rematch of Washington's only prior Super Bowl appearance ten years prior, the Redskins—in a game famous for Washington's "70 Chip" play on fourth-and-1—went on to beat the Miami Dolphins 27–17 to win Super Bowl XVII. It was the Redskins’ first ever Super Bowl victory, and their first NFL Championship in 40 years. Combining the post-season and their first Super Bowl victory, the Redskins finished the season with an overall record of 12–1.

Offseason

NFL Draft

Roster

Preseason

Regular season

Schedule

Game summaries

Week 1

Week 2

Week 3

Week 4

Week 5

Week 6

Week 7

Week 8

Week 9

Standings

Fun Bunch 
The Fun Bunch was the nickname for the wide receivers and tight ends of the Washington Redskins of the National Football League during the early 1980s. Known for their choreographed group celebrations in the end zone (usually a group high-five) following a touchdown.

The members of the Fun Bunch included the Redskins' wide receivers Art Monk, Virgil Seay, Charlie Brown, and Alvin Garrett, and tight ends Rick Walker, and Don Warren. Every single one of these players won a Super Bowl with the Redskins, and three have been chosen for the Pro Bowl. The first high-five leap performed by the Fun Bunch occurred after an Alvin Garrett touchdown 1982 first-round Playoff game against the Detroit Lions.

The Fun Bunch celebration was begun as a tribute to Art Monk, who was injured late in the 1982 regular season and could not participate in the playoffs that year. Garrett forgot about the arranged celebration after his first two touchdown grabs against the Lions. Thankfully, he nabbed a third TD, and the Fun Bunch was born.

The celebration continued into the following year, with Monk joining in. Some Redskins opponents, however, had begun to get annoyed with the display. In a week 15 game against the rival Dallas Cowboys, things came to a head. The game would decide both which team would win the NFC East division, and which of the two teams would have home field advantage throughout the playoffs. In the second half, with the Redskins leading 14–10, Darrell Green intercepted a Danny White pass on a carom. On the very next play, quarterback Joe Theismann hit Art Monk for a 43-yard touchdown pass and catch to break the game open. After the score, the Redskins' receivers gathered in the end zone to celebrate, but were joined by members of the Cowboys secondary. There was some pushing and shoving between the players, and the Fun Bunch went ahead and jumped, albeit with very little high-fiving possible. Both teams were assessed a penalty for unsportsman-like behavior, which offset each other, and the game continued.

The Fun Bunch celebrations were discontinued the following year. NFL rule changes regarding excessive celebrations made such pre-planned group activities a penalty, although this rule was subsequently scaled back. The Fun Bunch remains an iconic symbol of the success the Redskins had in 1982 and 1983.

Playoffs 

Notes:

 All times are EASTERN time.

1982 NFC First Round vs Detroit Lions

1982 NFC Second Round vs Minnesota Vikings

Running back John Riggins led the Redskins to a victory with 185 rushing yards and a touchdown.

1982 NFC Championship Game: vs Dallas Cowboys

John Riggins, who ran nine straight times to help Washington run out the clock in the final period, finished the game with 140 rushing yards and 2 touchdowns.

Super Bowl XVII: vs Miami Dolphins

Awards and records 
 Joe Gibbs, National Football League Coach of the Year Award
 Mark Moseley, National Football League Most Valuable Player Award,
 John Riggins, Super Bowl Most Valuable Player
 Joe Theismann, Bert Bell Award
 Joe Theismann, NFC Leader, Passer Rating (91.3)
 Jim Speros, recognized as youngest full-time assistant coach in NFL history.

1983 AFC-NFC Pro Bowl

Media

Pre season Local TV

Local Radio

References 

Washington Redskins seasons
National Football Conference championship seasons
Washington Redskins
Super Bowl champion seasons
Wash